Transgender or Trans Day may refer to:
 International Transgender Day of Visibility, annual event for transgender people
 Trans Day of Action, annual rally and march held in June
 Trans Day of Revenge, 2016 EP by G.L.O.S.S.
 Transgender Day of Remembrance, day to memorialize those who have been killed as a result of transphobia

See also
 Transgender Awareness Week, One-week celebration leading up to Transgender Day of Remembrance
 :Category:Transgender events